Ioan Mircea Pașcu (born 17 February 1949) is a Romanian politician and Member of the European Parliament (MEP) from Romania. He previously served Minister of Defense from 2000 to 2004. He is a member of the Social Democratic Party (PDSR/PSD), part of the Party of European Socialists.

Positions in the European Parliament 

 Vice-chair of the Committee on Foreign Affairs
 Vice-chair of the delegation for relations with the NATO Parliamentary Assembly
 Member of the Subcommittee on Security and Defence  
 Member of the delegation for relations with Japan
 Substitute member of the Committee on Transport and Tourism
 Substitute member of the delegation for relations with the United States

Curriculum vitae 

Academic career

 1971            Diploma in Foreign Trade Faculty of Foreign Trade, Academy of Economic Studies Bucharest 
 1980,            Doctorate in Political Sciences Institute of Political Sciences Bucharest 
 1971−1986,     Researcher, Department of International Relations Institute of Political Sciences, Department of International Relations Bucharest 
 1973,            Researcher, Salzburg Seminar for American Studies
 1979−1981,     Fellow, Ford Foundation grant
 1985,            Invited Associate Professor, St. Catherine's College, Oxford
 1986−1988,     Lecturer in International Relations Academy of Political and Social Sciences Bucharest 
 1988−1989,     Resident researcher Institute for East-West Security Studies New York 
 1992−1993,     Grant, Japan Foundation, Centre for Slavic Studies, University of Hokkaido (Sapporo) and foreign researcher, Japanese Forum for International Relations
 1990−1996,     Dean of the Faculty of International Relations National School of Political Studies and Public Administration  Bucharest 
 1990−present,  Professor of International Relations National School of Political Studies and Public Administration Bucharest

Political career

 31/12/1989−01/07/1990,  Member of the Committee on Foreign Policy, Council of the National Salvation Front Council of the National Salvation Front 
 09/02/1990−15/05/1990, Member of the Provisional National Unity Council Provisional National Unity Council 
 01/07/1990–01/10/1992, Presidential counsellor,  Head of the Foreign Policy Directorate, Department of Political Analysis,  Romanian Presidential Administration
 1990−1992, Vice-president of the National Salvation Front
 1996−2000, Member of the Romanian Parliament for Maramures Chair of the Committee on Defence Chamber of Deputies, Romanian Parliament
 22/03/1993 − 22/11/1996, State Secretary for Defence Policy and International Relations  Ministry of National Defence 
 1997−2006,  Vice-president of the Social Democratic Party
 2000−2007,  Member of the Romanian Parliament for Satu Mare Chamber of Deputies, Romanian Parliament
 2000−2004, Minister of National Defence Ministry of National Defence
 01/01/2007−01/07/2019, Member of the European Parliament

References

External links
European Parliament profile Implant de Par - Ioan Mircea Popescu
European Parliament official photo
 Europolis - Ioan Mircea Pașcu's blog

1949 births
Living people
MEPs for Romania 2007
MEPs for Romania 2007–2009
MEPs for Romania 2009–2014
MEPs for Romania 2014–2019
People from Satu Mare
Romanian Ministers of Defence
Romanian presidential advisors
Social Democratic Party (Romania) MEPs
Social Democratic Party (Romania) politicians
National University of Political Studies and Public Administration alumni